Tanvir (also spelled Tanbhir, Tanbheer, Tanveer, Tanweer, or Tanwir) (Pashto/Persian/Urdu: ,; ,) is a unisex given name and surname, derived from Arabic  meaning 'enlightenment', also derived from Hindi and Punjabi languages in India meaning 'strong in body, brave from body'.

Notable people with this given name
Tanveer Ahmed (boxer), Pakistani boxer
Tanveer Ahmed (footballer), Pakistani footballer
Tanveer Ahmed (psychiatrist), Bangladeshi-Australian psychiatrist and journalist
Tanvir Ahmed, Pakistani cricketer
Tanvir Mahmood Ahmed, Pakistan Air Force officer
Tanveer Ghani, British actor
Tanvir Gill, a news anchor at CNBC
Tanveer Haider, Bangladeshi cricketer
Rana Tanveer Hussain, former Minister in Pakistan
Tanvir Hussain, English terrorist convicted for the 2006 transatlantic aircraft plot
Tanvir Islam, Bangladeshi scientist
Tanveer Ashraf Kaira, Politician
Tanvir Ahmad Khan, Pakistan Air Force officer
Tanvir Mehdi, Pakistani cricketer
Tanvir Mokammel, Bangladeshi film director
Tanveer Naqvi, Pakistani general
Tanvir Sadiq, Indian politician
Tanveer Zaidi.Indian film actor and educationist
Tanvir  Islam,  Bangladeshi cricketer
Tanvir Ahmed, Bangladeshi cricket umpire 
Tanvir Tareq,  Bangladeshi music composer, director, singer, and television anchor

Notable people with this surname
Habib Tanvir, Indian theatre director
Nial Tanvir, British astronomer
Shehzad Tanweer, English Islamic terrorist and perpetrator of the 7/7 attacks
Sohail Tanvir, Pakistani cricketer

See also
Tanwir al-Miqbas, Islamic study book

References

Pakistani masculine given names